Music Is Our Friend: Live in Washington and Albany is a live album released by King Crimson on 20 November 2021. It is an official bootleg featuring King Crimson's final performances in North America in September of that year (and presumably the final tour by the band). It also features four songs from the pre-tour "Friends And Family" show in Albany.

Tour 
The Music Is Our Friend tour was scheduled for 2020, but was postponed a full year due to the COVID-19 pandemic. The tour began in July 2021 in Florida. There was a two-week break, and multiple shows had to be moved due to extreme weather, but no shows were cancelled. According to Robert Fripp, this is most likely the final tour by the band as there has been no activity from the band since.

Content 
The album was released as a double CD with each CD around 60 minutes long. The first 15 tracks were from the final performances of the "Music Is Our Friend" Tour. The last four were taken from the pre-tour in Albany. The songs they play come from throughout the entire band's lifetime.

Critical reception 

Writing for All About Jazz, John Kelman enjoyed the album, stating that the band had evolved and taken old music and made it new again. He considered the release to be a large step forward for the band, highlighting all of the band members' skills as musicians.

Track listing

References 

2021 live albums
King Crimson live albums